A toy library lends or hires out toys, puzzles, and games, functioning either as a rental shop or a form of family resource program. Toy libraries offer play sessions for families and a wide range of toys appropriate for children at different stages in their development. Toy libraries provide children with new toys every week or two, saving parents money and keeping children from getting bored. Popular in the French-speaking world, toy libraries are called ludothèques.

History 
Toy libraries have existed since at least 1935, with the establishment of one in Los Angeles. The idea re-emerged and gained popularity in the United States in the 60s and 70s with the passage of Head Start and other legislation.

See also 
A lekotek is a toy and play library with a specific focus on children with special needs. Adapting to the technology world, there are online toys and games libraries coming up in different parts of the world.

References

External links

 United States Toy Library Association
 Toy Library Federation of New Zealand
 Toy Libraries Australia

Renting
Toy culture
Public commons
Types of library